Gianni Miguel dos Santos (born 21 November 1998) is a professional footballer who plays as a forward for Atlético Ottawa in the Canadian Premier League. Born in the Netherlands, he plays for the Cape Verde national team.

Club career
Dos Santos made his professional debut on 22 December 2017 for FC Dordrecht in the Eerste Divisie, in the 2–3 home loss to Jong PSV. He came on as a substitute for Denis Mahmudov in the 69th minute. In the summer of 2018, he left for Jong Sparta, where he played in the third-tier Tweede Divisie. He made his debut in the first team of Sparta on 18 November 2018, in the 1–1 away draw against NEC. He came on for Ilias Alhaft in the 67th minute.

In October 2020, Dos Santos returned to Dordrecht. He immediately impressed in his first match back, scoring and giving an assist in the 2–2 draw against Almere City, as he was rewarded with the 'man of the match' award afterwards. Head coach of Dordrecht, Harry van den Ham, called Dos Santos a "diamond in the rough" after his performance against Almere City and lauded his pace and threat in front of goal.

On 20 May 2021, Dos Santos signed with Canadian Premier League club Pacific FC. Dos Santos is the third international player to sign with Pacific FC for the 2021 season. 

In February 2023, he signed with Atlético Ottawa.

International career
In March 2020 dos Santos was called up to Cape Verde. He was called up again in June 2022 for a friendly against Ecuador in Miami. He made his debut for his country in the match on June 11, as a second-half substitute in an eventual 1-0 defeat.

References

1998 births
Living people
Association football forwards
Cape Verdean footballers
Cape Verde international footballers
Dutch footballers
Footballers from Rotterdam
Dutch people of Cape Verdean descent
Dutch expatriate footballers
Cape Verdean expatriate footballers
Expatriate soccer players in Canada
Dutch expatriate sportspeople in Canada
Cape Verdean expatriate sportspeople in Canada
FC Dordrecht players
Sparta Rotterdam players
Pacific FC players
Eerste Divisie players
Tweede Divisie players
Canadian Premier League players
Atlético Ottawa players